The Peruvian version of Reyes de la pista (The Kings of the Dance floor) is a spin-off or continuation of the successful reality television musical  "Bailando por un Sueño" being the premiere date of November 15, 2008, hosted by Gisela Valcárcel The programs will be broadcast on Saturdays at 10 pm (−5 GMT) by Panamericana Television live from the studios Monitor, located in the Lima district of San Borja

Concept and schedule
Reyes de la pista is a musical realityand then direct "Dancing for a Dream ", where they face in a dance competition eight couples who occupied the first four places in the first two seasons of that show. Each pair is made up of a "dreamer" and a famous or "hero". The pair won under this program will be a prize of 30769 dollars and represent the Peru in Second International Dance Championship''', which will possibly take place in Argentina year 2009.Reyes de la pista, like his predecessor, will be part of theprime time''on Saturday Panamericana Television, will air from 10:00 pm, lasting about two hours and a half, and also include the transmission of micro daily news from Monday to Friday throughout the regular programming of this television channel.

Jury
 Joaquin Vargas (Theatre director, Television producer and director of the new virtual version of Nubeluz)
 Morella Petrozzi (professional dancer)
 Carlos Cacho (Make-up artist for television and Host)
 Pachi Valle Riestra (professional dancer)

Participants

Peruvian reality television series
2008 Peruvian television series debuts
2000s Peruvian television series
Panamericana Televisión original programming